is the fourth single by Japanese entertainer Akina Nakamori. Written by Masao Urino and Yoshiyuki Ohsawa, the single was released on February 23, 1983, by Warner Pioneer through the Reprise label. It was also the lead single from her first greatest hits album Best Akina Memoires.

Background 
"½ no Shinwa" was originally titled , but NHK executives insisted to have the title changed under the network's strict broadcasting regulations. Lyricist Urino was dissatisfied with the title change, as he felt it hindered the impact of the song.

Composer Ohsawa self-covered "½ no Shinwa" on his 1994 album Collage. Nakamori has re-recorded the song for the 2006 compilation Best Finger 25th Anniversary Selection. In 2010, she re-recorded the song for the pachinko machine .

Chart performance 
"½ no Shinwa" became Nakamori's second No. 1 on Oricon's weekly singles chart and sold over 573,100 copies.

Track listing 
All music is arranged by Mitsuo Hagita.

Charts

References

External links 
 
 
 

1983 singles
1983 songs
Akina Nakamori songs
Japanese-language songs
Songs with lyrics by Masao Urino
Warner Music Japan singles
Reprise Records singles
Oricon Weekly number-one singles